Doctors Lake may refer to:

 Doctors Lake (Nova Scotia)
 Doctors Lake (Florida)